Holdich is a surname. Notable people with the surname include: 

George Holdich (1816–1896), British organist and organ builder
Thomas Holdich (1843–1929), British geographer